Harris Township is a civil township of Menominee County in the U.S. state of Michigan. The population was 1,895 at the 2000 census.

Communities 
A post office named "DeLoughary" was first established here on July 8, 1880, named for its first postmaster, George W. DeLoughary, a local farmer. The office was closed on May 4, 1883, after DeLoughary resigned. The office reopened on July 13, 1883, with postmaster Michael B. Harris, a lumberman who had settled here in 1875 and was later a state legislator. On September 6, 1900, the office was renamed for him.
A railroad was built through here in 1873 to haul ore and timber. The settlement was named for Menasippe Perron, who built a dam and sawmill here in 1883, and became the first postmaster on September 11, 1897.

Geography
Most of the Hannahville Indian Community Indian reservation is located within Harris Township.

Demographics
As of the census of 2000, there were 1,895 people, 656 households, and 516 families residing in the township.  The population density was 13.2 per square mile (5.1/km2).  There were 862 housing units at an average density of 6.0 per square mile (2.3/km2).  The racial makeup of the township was 76.20% White, 0.11% African American, 21.16% Native American, 0.11% Asian, 0.69% from other races, and 1.74% from two or more races. Hispanic or Latino of any race were 1.37% of the population.

There were 656 households, out of which 38.4% had children under the age of 18 living with them, 61.7% were married couples living together, 12.0% had a female householder with no husband present, and 21.3% were non-families. 17.5% of all households were made up of individuals, and 6.1% had someone living alone who was 65 years of age or older.  The average household size was 2.89 and the average family size was 3.25.

In the township the population was spread out, with 30.8% under the age of 18, 8.7% from 18 to 24, 28.8% from 25 to 44, 21.7% from 45 to 64, and 10.0% who were 65 years of age or older.  The median age was 34 years. For every 100 females, there were 106.7 males.  For every 100 females age 18 and over, there were 103.4 males.

The median income for a household in the township was $32,950, and the median income for a family was $38,382. Males had a median income of $26,908 versus $22,583 for females. The per capita income for the township was $14,764.  About 8.7% of families and 14.5% of the population were below the poverty line, including 21.8% of those under age 18 and 11.0% of those age 65 or over.

Education
Most of the township is in the Bark River-Harris School District, while a portion is in the North Central Area Schools.

Hannahville Indian School, a Bureau of Indian Education-affiliated tribal school (which also functions as a charter school) is in the township.

Notes

Townships in Menominee County, Michigan
Marinette micropolitan area
Townships in Michigan